| tries = {{#expr:

 + 6  + 12 + 9 + 5 + 10 + 5  + 3 + 6 + 7 + 5
 + 7  +  4 + 4 + 6 +  6 + 1  + 8 + 3 + 5 + 1
 + 10 +  5 + 5 + 6 +  6 + 6  + 7 + 4 + 6 + 6
 + 4  +  5 + 8 + 5 +  8 + 14 + 7 + 2 + 6 + 5
 + 18 + 10 + 2 + 7 +  7 + 10 + 4 + 4 + 5 + 3
 + 5  +  4 + 6 + 6 +  5 + 9  + 6 + 5 + 6 + 3
 + 3 + 6 + 7 + 4
 + 6 + 4
 + 2
}}
| top point scorer = Sam Hidalgo-Clyne (Edinburgh)(99 points)
| top try scorer = Lloyd Williams (Cardiff Blues)(6 tries)
| venue               = The Stoop, Twickenham
| attendance2         = 
| champions           =  Gloucester
| count               = 2
| runner-up           =  Edinburgh
| website             = EPCR Website
| previous year       = 2013–14
| previous tournament = 2013–14 European Challenge Cup
| next year           = 2015–16
| next tournament     = 2015–16 European Rugby Challenge Cup
}}
The 2014–15 European Rugby Challenge Cup was the first season of the European Rugby Challenge Cup, the annual rugby union competition. It is the 19th season of second tier pan-European club competition in general, as the competition replaces the European Challenge Cup. The competition began with the first round of the group stage, on the weekend of 16 October 2014, and ended with the final on 1 May 2015 at the Twickenham Stoop.

Gloucester became the first ever champions of the newly formatted competition, beating Edinburgh, who became the first ever Scottish team to make a European final, 19–13, with 14 men on the pitch for the final 17 minutes with center Bill Meakes being sent off because of a dangerous high tackle of the ball on Edinburgh center Sam Beard.

Teams
Twenty teams qualified for the 2014–15 European Rugby Challenge Cup, based on their performance in their respective domestic leagues the previous season. The distribution of teams is as follows:
 England: 5 teams
 Any teams finishing between 8th-11th position in the Aviva Premiership. (4 Teams)
 The champion of the 2013–14 Greene King IPA Championship. (1 Team)
 France: 8 teams
 Any teams finishing between 8th-12th position in the Top 14. (5 Teams)
 The champion, and the winner of the promotion play-off, from the Pro D2. (2 Teams)
 There will be an 8th team from France, as Stade Français lost the 7th-place play-off for entry into the European Rugby Champions Cup. (1 team)
 Ireland, Italy, Scotland & Wales: 5 teams
 Any teams that did not qualify for the European Rugby Champions Cup through the 2013–14 RaboDirect Pro12
 Other European Nations: 2 teams
 Two teams will qualify through the Qualifying Competition, which will take place in September.

So far, the following 18 teams have qualified.

Champions Cup play-off

The following teams took part in the play-off to decide the final team in the Champions Cup. The play-off was held between the seventh-placed teams in the English Premiership and the Top 14. The loser of this play-off entered the Challenge Cup.

On 29 April 2014, it was announced that this play-off would take place over two legs, on the weekends of 17/18 May and 24/25 May, with a draw being used to determine home advantage for each leg.

The draw took place in Heathrow on 6 May 2014. Following the draw, the fixtures were announced as follows:

Stade Français lost the play-off 35-50 on aggregate, and will play in the Challenge Cup.

Qualifying Competition

On 14 August 2014, EPCR announced the format for the first Qualifying Competition.

Given the amount of time until the start of the Challenge Cup, it was announced that this first competition will consist of two ties, played over two legs, with the aggregate winner of each taking a place in either pool. The first legs took place on 20 September, with the return legs taking place on 27 September

Rugby Europe 1 play-off

 Rovigo Delta won the play-off 46–39 on aggregate, and qualify for Pool 1.

Rugby Europe 2 play-off

 București Wolves won the play-off 28–26 on aggregate, and qualify for Pool 3

Team details
Below is the list of coaches, captain and stadiums with their method of qualification for each team.

Note: Placing shown in brackets, denotes standing at the end of the regular season for their respective leagues, with their end of season positioning shown through CH for champions, RU for runner-up, SF for losing semi-finalist and QF for losing quarter-finalist.

Seeding
The 20 competing teams will be seeded and split into four tiers, seeding will be based on performance in their respective domestic leagues. Where promotion and relegation is in effect in a league, the promoted team will be seeded last, or (if multiple teams are promoted) by performance in the lower tier. So, Lyon – who were Pro D2 champions – will be the seventh Top 14 seed while La Rochelle – who qualified through the Pro D2 play-off – will be the eighth seed.

As with the previous European competition, the European Challenge Cup, teams from the same country will be kept apart where possible. However, as 8 teams have qualified from France, 3 pools will contain two French teams – Oyonnax, Lyon and La Rochelle.

For the purposes of creating the tiers, the clubs are ranked based on their finishing positions in the Top 14, Aviva Premiership, Pro12 and PRO D2 Leagues, or on their qualification via a play-off.

Teams will be taken from a league in order of rank and put into a tier. A draw is used allocate two second seeds to Tier 1, the remaining team will go into Tier 2. This allocation then determines which fourth seeded team enters Tier 2, while the others enter Tier 3.

Given the nature of the Qualifying Competition, a competition including developing rugby nations and Italian clubs not competing in the Pro12, Rugby Europe 1 and Rugby Europe 2 are automatically included in Tier 4, despite officially being ranked 1/2 from that competition.

The brackets show each teams seeding and their league (for example, 1 Top 14 indicates the team has been seeded 1st from the Top 14).

Pool stage

The draw took place on 10 June 2014, at the Stade de la Maladière in Neuchâtel.

Teams will play each other twice, both at home and away, in the group stage, that will begin on the weekend of 16/17/18/19 October 2014, and continue through to 22/23/24/25 January 2015, before the pool winners and three best runners-up progress to the quarter finals.

Fixtures were announced on Thursday 14 August 2014 at 2pm.

Teams are awarded competition points, based on match result. Teams receive 4 points for a win, 2 points for a draw, 1 attacking bonus point for scoring four or more tries in a match and 1 defensive bonus point for losing a match by seven points or fewer.

In the event of a tie between two or more teams, the following tie-breakers are used, as directed by EPCR:
 Where teams have played each other
 The club with the greater number of competition points from only matches involving tied teams.
 If equal, the club that scored the most tries in those matches.
 If equal, the club with the best aggregate points difference from those matches.
 Where teams remain tied and/or have not played each other in the competition (i.e. are from different pools)
 If equal, the club with the best aggregate points difference from the pool stage.
 The club that scored the most tries in the pool stage.
 If equal, the club with the fewest players suspended in the pool stage.
 If equal, the drawing of lots will determine a club's ranking.

Pool 1

Pool 2

Pool 3

Pool 4

Pool 5

Seeding and runners-up

Knock-out stage
The eight qualifiers will be seeded according to performance in the pool stage, and compete in the quarter-finals, which will be held on the 3/4/5 April 2015. The four top seeds will host the quarter-finals against the lower seeds, in a 1v8, 2v7, 3v6 and 4v5 format.

The semi-finals, to be contested by the quarter-final winners, will take place on the weekend of 17/18/19 April 2015.

The winners of the semi-finals will contest the final, at The Twickenham Stoop, on the weekend of 1 May 2015.

Bracket

Quarter-finals

Semi-finals

Final

See also
2014–15 European Rugby Champions Cup

Notes

References

 
2014-15
2014–15 rugby union tournaments for clubs
2014–15 in European rugby union
2014–15 in English rugby union
2014–15 in French rugby union
2014–15 in Irish rugby union
2014–15 in Italian rugby union
2014–15 in Scottish rugby union
2014–15 in Welsh rugby union
2014–15 in Romanian rugby union